The Scheibe SF 26 Super Spatz is a German sailplane that was designed by Egon Scheibe in the 1960s.

Design
The SF 26 Super Spatz featured 3-piece wood wing, a tail made of wood and fabric, and a steel-tube/fabric fuselage with a fiberglass nose.

Specifications

References

Further reading

External links
 photos

1960s German sailplanes
Scheibe SF-26
Single-engined tractor aircraft
Low-wing aircraft
Aircraft first flown in 1961